The Box Set is a five-CD collection of recordings drawn from the Kiss archives reportedly selected by the band. The Box Set includes 94 tracks, including 30 previously unreleased band and solo demos, outtakes, live recordings, and a 120-page color booklet with track-by-track commentary by band members Gene Simmons, Paul Stanley, Ace Frehley, and Peter Criss, detailed track information, photos and essays. A limited number of the set were released in a guitar case-shaped box.

Reception

The Box Set peaked at #128 on the Billboard 200 and was certified gold by the RIAA on December 18, 2001.

Track listing

Notes
1.Later released on the 2014 Deluxe Edition of Love Gun.
2.Later released on Alive! The Millennium Concert.

Charts

Certifications

References

Kiss (band) compilation albums
2001 compilation albums